In electronics and chaos theory, Chua's diode is a type of two-terminal, nonlinear active resistor which can be described with piecewise-linear equations.   It is an essential part of Chua's circuit, a simple electronic oscillator circuit which exhibits chaotic oscillations and is widely used as an example for a chaotic system.   It is implemented as a voltage-controlled, nonlinear negative resistor.

The diode is not sold commercially, and is usually built from standard circuit components such as diodes, capacitors, resistors and op-amps.  There are multiple ways to simulate Chua's diode using such components.  One standard design is realized by connecting two negative impedance converters in parallel.  A negative impedance converter (NIC) is a simple op amp circuit that has negative resistance.   Another implementation uses one negative impedance converter to create the negative resistance characteristic, and a diode-resistor network to create the nonlinear characteristic.  

Chua's diode was invented by Leon Chua, who is also the inventor of Chua's circuit.

References

External links
Chua's circuit and Chua's diode diagrams

Diodes